Caloptilia ferruginella is a moth of the family Gracillariidae. It is known from the United States (California).

The larvae feed on Rhododendron occidentale. They mine the leaves of their host plant. The mine has the form of a tentiform mine on the underside of the leaf, later the larva rolls the leaf from the tip down into a cone.

References

ferruginella
Moths of North America
Moths described in 1918